2009 Turkish Open is a darts tournament, which took place in Turkey on October 25, 2009.

Results

References

2009 in darts
2009 in Turkish sport
Darts in Turkey